The Peter Axel Johnson House at 1075 N. 100 East in Pleasant Grove, Utah was built in 1876.  It includes both Greek Revival architecture and Scandinavian pair-house architecture.  The house is a one and half story stone house.  It was built by Peter Axel Johnson, a Mormon who emigrated from Sweden.

Peter Axel Johnson (1843-1936) was born in Alminge, Sweden.  After converting to the LDS church, he immigrated to Utah in 1871.

It was listed on the National Register of Historic Places in 1984.

References

Pair-houses
Houses on the National Register of Historic Places in Utah
Greek Revival houses in Utah
Houses completed in 1876
Houses in Utah County, Utah
National Register of Historic Places in Utah County, Utah
Buildings and structures in Pleasant Grove, Utah